Anatol Marco Josepho (born Anatolу Markovich Yozefovich, later germanized as Anatol Josephewitz; March 31, 1894 – December 16, 1980), was a Jewish immigrant to the United States from Tomsk, Russia, who invented and patented the first automated photo booth in 1925, which was named the "Photomaton". In 1927, he was paid one million dollars for the invention.

Biography 
Josepho's father was a wealthy jeweler and his mother died when he was three years old. He developed a close bond with his father and became interested in the Wild West cultural phenomenon of expansion in the United States in the late 1800s. He began taking photographs with a Brownie camera produced by the Eastman Kodak Company during his childhood and he attended a local technical institute to pursue his growing interest in photography in 1909 at the age of 15. On the eve of world war I, his father sent him to study in Germany. There, he studied the photo art to perfection. It was there that he conceived the idea of creating a photo machine that would work without an operator inside and would be able to produce photos automatically, but from the moment of conception to implementation it took more than 12 years. At 19, he opened his own studio in Budapest, Hungary. With the beginning of the First world war, he then moved to Shanghai. There he survived the revolution of 1917 and for a time worked as a photographer in his own photo studio. In the early 1920s, he briefly returned to Tomsk, where he soon left to the United States. In the early 1920s, he worked in New York to develop the Photomaton.  In July 1926, he met and married Ganna Belle Kehlmann (January 10, 1904 – October 19, 1978).  The two were friends with their neighbor, performer Will Rogers and his wife Betty Blake.  They had two children, both boys.  He died on December 16, 1980, at the age of 86 in a rest home in La Jolla from a series of strokes.

The Photomaton 

Josepho's invention of the photo booth, known as the "Photomaton", debuted in September 1926 at 1659 Broadway Street in Manhattan, located in the heart of New York City. The Photomaton charged twenty-five cents for a strip of eight photos that were developed in eight minutes. The automation was achieved in a room that synchronized a coin controlled camera that featured a single source of diffuse light. White-gloved attendants stayed by the machine during hours of operation to control the crowds as well as to provide maintenance for the machine.  Around 280,000 customers, for instance, waited the eight-minute process as reported by Time magazine in April 1927. The Photomaton Company was created to place Photomaton machines all over the country.  Future President Franklin D. Roosevelt was a member of the board of directors.
In 1928, Josepho sold the rights to the machine to Henry Morgenthau Sr. for $1,000,000, . In an interview with The New York Times, Morgenthau said that the machine will allow them "to do in the photographic field what Woolworths has done in novelties and merchandise, Ford in automobiles". The following year, the machine was introduced to the European market, where notable figures such as André Breton and Salvador Dalí had their portraits taken.

Legacy
Camp Josepho, a 110-acre property, which stretches from Mandeville Canyon to Will Rogers State Park, was given to the Boy Scouts of the Crescent Bay Council on July 7, 1941, by Anatol Josepho Sixty-five years later, Camp Josepho under the Western Los Angeles County Council (WLACC) continues to fulfill its mission of serving youth throughout Los Angeles, with a unique emphasis on filmmaking, shooting sports, and computer programming.  Remnants of what once was Josepho's personal mansion can be found between the camp and Murphy Ranch.

References 

1980 deaths
1894 births
American people of Russian-Jewish descent
20th-century American inventors